Drepanophoridae is a family of worms belonging to the order Hoplonemertea.

Genera

Genera:
 Bergia Bürger, 1890
 Coella Stiasny-Wijnhoff, 1936
 Curranemertes Kirsteuer, 1973

References

Polystilifera
Nemertea families